Aila or AILA may refer to:

Places
Aila, the Roman and Arabic name for Aqaba, a town in Jordan, and also the Arabic name for a fortress on the nearby Pharaoh's Island
Äila, a village in Estonia
Ailã, a river in Brazil which has its source at Monte Caburaí

Organizations
American Immigration Lawyers Association
Australian Institute of Landscape Architects
Association Internationale de la Linguistique Appliquée, the International Association of Applied Linguistics
American Indian Library Association
AILA, the NASDAQ symbol for Air L.A., a former American regional airline

Other
Aila (liquor), a Newari alcoholic beverage
Aeropuerto Internacional Las Américas, an international airport in the Dominican Republic
Aila dynasty, a dynasty of kings of ancient India
Aila (name) a feminine given name
Cyclone Aila, a 2009 cyclone
Aila (Suikoden III), a fictional character from the PlayStation 2 video game Suikoden III 
Aila, an alternate name of the Tahitian Chestnut tree (Inocarpus fagifer)